The Carbon-Thompson is a large coal field located in the western part of Canada in Alberta. Carbon-Thompson represents one of the largest coal reserve in Canada having estimated reserves of 183 billion tonnes of coal.

See also 
Coal in Alberta
List of coalfields

References 

Coal in Canada